Leila Mustafa (born September 12, 1988) is Co-Chair of the Civil Council of Raqqa, Syria, which has been under joint Arab-Kurdish control since April 2017.

Early life and education
Mustafa studied Civil Engineering before the Syrian Civil War. In 2013, rebels from the Free Syrian Army and Jabhat Al-Nusra took over Raqqa, before ISIS arrived in 2014, which prompted Mustafa to flee with her family, paying smugglers to take them to al-Hasakah.

Political career
In late 2018, CBS reported that Mustafa was "chosen by a group of community leaders to run the new civilian council and is the closest thing Raqqa has to a mayor."

Before the fall of Raqqa, the Raqqa Civil Council (RCC) was based in Ain Issa, 50 km north of Raqqa. Reuters described the RCC as "a diverse team co-led by Arab tribal leader Sheikh Mahmoud Shawakh al-Bursan, who wears tribal robes, and Kurdish civil engineer Leila Mustafa, dressed in a green shirt and jeans."

The UN estimated that 80% of buildings in Raqqa had been destroyed in the conflict, and the city had been littered with landmines by ISIS. Mustafa is aiming to rebuild the city, but has said that it is a difficult task without more international funding. "“We are striving to rehabilitate the city to the best of our ability, but we are facing many challenges restoring basic services due to the massive level of destruction", she told The Intercept. 150,000 people have reportedly returned to Raqqa since the end of ISIS control of the city, but in August 2018, the US announced that it would cut $230m in stabilisation funding for Northern Syria. Mustafa has stated that the RCC has repopened 200 schools and 70 bakeries.

Mustafa is a supporter of jailed Kurdistan Workers' Party (PKK) leader Abdullah Ocalan. The Times reported Mustafa as saying “The thoughts of our leader, Abdullah Ocalan, were the key factor in the liberation of Raqqa”.

References

Living people
1988 births
People of the Syrian civil war
Syrian Kurdish politicians
21st-century Syrian women politicians
21st-century Syrian politicians
21st-century Kurdish women politicians